There are 387 lakes in Oakland County, Michigan. Of those lakes, 317 are named while 70 are unnamed lakes.

List

Public boat launches 
Twelve all-sports lakes have public boat launches: Big Lake, Cass Lake, Cedar Island Lake, Crescent Lake , Lake Oakland, Lake Orion, Long Lake (Commerce Township), Maceday Lake, Pontiac Lake, Tipsico Lake, Union Lake, and White Lake. In addition, no-wake lakes in Oakland County with public boat launches include Crooked Lake, Heron Lake, Kent Lake and Wildwood Lake.

References 

 
Oakland County